Lionel B. Cade (August 14, 1918 – April 3, 1990) was an American accountant who served as mayor of Compton, California, from 1977 until 1981.

Biography

Cade was born in Hardin County, Texas on August 14, 1918, the son of Charley and Virginia (Slocum) Cade. During World War II, he was a member of the U.S. Army's first black paratroop battalion, the 555th. He also served his country during the Korean War.

Cade earned a bachelor's degree at the University of San Francisco and a master's from USC.

When the Rev. Raul Imschweiler did not seek re-election to the Compton City Council in 1961, Cade ran for his seat. He lost to Robert Kerr by just 413 votes. In 1964, he was appointed to the Council, one of the first African Americans to serve there. He was elected to a four-year term the following year and reelected in 1969. He was a member of the council until 1973, when he made his first attempt as mayor. He finished third. Despite that defeat, he was successful on his second try in 1977.

An accountant by profession, Cade ordered an audit of the city's finances soon after he took office. He discovered that the city had a deficit of $2 million. As a result of that finding, Cade initiated a series of cost-cutting measures that wiped out the debt within one year. In 1978, California voters overwhelmingly approved Proposition 13, an initiative that severely reduced property tax revenues. Since much of the fat was already eliminated from Compton's budget, it was one of the hardest hit by the measure.

In his 1981 reelection campaign, Cade was soundly defeated by his opponent, Walter R. Tucker, Jr., a local dentist. Cade later moved to Stockton, where he spent the remainder of his life.

Death
Cade died on April 3, 1990 from emphysema.

References

Sources 
Los Angeles Times, "Former Councilman and Mayor Lionel Cade Dies," April 12, 1990, page J-2.
Miller, Gary J., Cities by Contract: The Politics of Municipal Incorporation, The MIT Press, Cambridge, Massachusetts and London, England, 1981

African-American mayors in California
Mayors of Compton, California
1918 births
1990 deaths
20th-century American politicians
Compton, California City Council members
Deaths from emphysema
African-American city council members in California
United States Army personnel of World War II
United States Army personnel of the Korean War
20th-century African-American politicians
African-American men in politics